Osmotrophy is  a feeding mechanism involving the movement of dissolved organic compounds by osmosis for nutrition. Organisms that use osmotrophy are called osmotrophs. Some mixotrophic microorganisms use osmotrophy to derive some of their energy. Osmotrophy is used by a diversity of organisms. Organisms that use osmotrophy include bacteria, many species of protists and most fungi. Some macroscopic animals like molluscs, sponges, corals, brachiopods and echinoderms may use osmotrophic feeding as a supplemental food source.

Process 
Osmotrophy as a means of gathering nutrients in microscopic organisms relies on cellular surface area to ensure that proper diffusion of nutrients occur in the cell. In other words, an osmotroph is an organism that has their "stomach" outside of their body. Sometimes, osmotrophs may still have an internal digestive system in addition to still using osmosis as a way to gain supplemental nutrients. Additionally, when organisms increase in size, the surface area per volume ratio drops and osmotrophy becomes insufficient to meet nutrient demands. Larger macroscopic organisms that rely on osmotrophy can compensate for a reduced surface area per volume ratio with a very flat, thin body. A tapeworm is an example of such adaptation.

In stagnant waters photoautotrophs have a relative advantage over heterotrophic osmotrophs since the flux of photons as an energy source are not hindered at low temperatures, thus it depends on diffusion for mass acquisition through Brownian diffusion. 

Osmotrophy differs from other cellular feeding mechanisms, but can also be found in a diversity of organisms. This allows for organisms to use osmosis in different environments.

Fungi  

Fungi are the biggest osmotrophic specialist since they are major degraders in all ecosystems. For organisms like fungi, osmotrophy facilitates the decomposition process. This is a result of the Osmotrophy resulting in metabolites that continue growth.

References

Further reading

See also 
 Autotrophy
 Heterotrophy
 Phototrophy
 Phagotrophy
 Mixotrophy

Microbial growth and nutrition